Stenosini is a tribe of darkling beetles in the subfamily Pimeliinae of the family Tenebrionidae. There are more than 40 genera in Stenosini.

Genera
These genera belong to the tribe Stenosini

 Afghanillus Kaszab, 1960  (the Palearctic)
 Anchomma LeConte, 1858  (North America)
 Anethas Jakobson, 1924  (tropical Africa)
 Araeoschizus LeConte, 1851  (North America)
 Aspidocephalus Motschulsky, 1839  (the Palearctic)
 Caribanosis Nabozhenko, Kirejtshuk, Merkl, Varela, Aalbu & Smith, 2016  (the Neotropics)
 Dichillus Jacquelin du Val, 1860  (the Palearctic)
 Discopleurus Lacordaire, 1859  (the Neotropics)
 Ecnomoderes Gebien, 1928  (the Neotropics)
 Ethas Pascoe, 1862  (Indomalaya)
 Eutagenia Reitter, 1886  (the Palearctic)
 Fitzsimonsium Koch, 1962  (tropical Africa)
 Gebieniella Koch, 1940  (Indomalaya)
 Grammicus G.R. Waterhouse, 1845  (the Neotropics)
 Harvengia Ferrer, 2004  (Indomalaya)
 Herbertfranzia Kaszab, 1973  (Indomalaya)
 Herbertfranziella Kaszab, 1973  (the Palearctic and Indomalaya)
 Hexagonochilus Solier, 1851  (the Neotropics)
 Indochillus Koch, 1941  (Indomalaya)
 Indostola G.S. Medvedev, 1991  (Indomalaya)
 Itampolis Koch, 1962  (tropical Africa)
 Microblemma Semenov, 1889  (the Palearctic)
 Microtelopsis Koch, 1940  (the Palearctic and Indomalaya)
 Microtelus Solier, 1838  (the Palearctic)
 Mitotagenia Reitter, 1916  (the Palearctic and tropical Africa)
 Nepalofranziella Fouquè, 2013  (Indomalaya)
 Oogaster Faldermann, 1837  (the Palearctic)
 Perdicus Fairmaire, 1899  (tropical Africa)
 Platamodes Ménétriés, 1849  (the Palearctic)
 Pseudethas Fairmaire, 1896  (the Palearctic and Indomalaya)
 Pseudochillus Fouquè, 2015  (Indomalaya)
 Reitterella Semenov, 1891  (the Palearctic)
 Renefouqueosis Aalbu, Smith, Kanda & Bouchard, 2017  (the Neotropics)
 Schizaraeus Kulzer, 1955  (the Neotropics)
 Schusteriella Koch, 1940  (tropical Africa)
 Stenosethas Kaszab, 1975  (Indomalaya)
 Stenosis Herbst, 1799  (the Palearctic, tropical Africa, and Indomalaya)
 Tagenostola Reitter, 1916  (the Palearctic and Indomalaya)
 Tetranillus Wasmann, 1899  (the Palearctic and Indomalaya)
 Timosmithus Ardoin, 1974  (tropical Africa)
 Typhlusechus Linell, 1897  (North America)
 † Miostenosis Wickham, 1913

References

Further reading

 
 

Tenebrionoidea